Jillian Alleyne is an American professional basketball player who is currently a free agent in the Women's National Basketball Association (WNBA). She played college basketball for University of Oregon.

High school
Alleyne graduated from Summit High School in Fontana, California, in 2012. She was a McDonald's All-American nominee, named Sunkist League MVP, an all-state selection, and Inland Valley Player of the Year.

Awards and honors
She recorded 21 consecutive double-doubles in an NCAA game, the third most in NCAA women's basketball history. She averaged 19.6 points per game and 16.3 rebounds per game during the 21 games.

Alleyne shared the media version of the Pac-12 Player of the Year award in 2016 with Oregon State's Jamie Weisner, who had also won the Pac-12 coaches' version of the award.

She led among Division I teams with 16.2 rebounds per game in her sophomore year 2013–14. The following year she was second, averaging 15.2 rebounds per game and in her senior year she was also second in the nation, averaging 13.6 rebounds per game. In each of her last three years, she was the nation's leader, among Division I players, in offensive rebounds per game. In 2014–15 she was the US leader in double doubles (double digit scoring and double digit rebounds). She recorded a double double in 29 games.

For her college career, she has the third most rebounds and the second most double doubles in NCAA Division I history.

Oregon  statistics
Source

WNBA career statistics

Regular season

|-
| align="left" | 2019
| align="left" | Minnesota
| 5 || 0 || 2.8 || .333 || .000 || .000 || 1.0 || 0.2 || 0.0 || 0.2 || 0.0 || 0.8
|-
| align="left" | 2021
| align="left" | Washington
| 2 || 0 || 4.0 || .000 || .000 || .000 || 2.0 || 0.0 || 0.5 || 0.0 || 0.0 || 0.0
|-
| align="left" | Career
| align="left" | 2 years, 2 teams
| 7 || 0 || 3.1 || .250 || .000 || .000 || 1.3 || 0.1 || 0.1 || 0.1 || 0.0 || 0.6

Personal life
Alleyne discovered an interest in country music after attending a Jason Aldean concert. Along with other members from the Ducks basketball team, she has done charity work in the Dominican Republic. In college, she is majoring in communication disorders and sciences.

References

External links
Oregon Ducks bio

1994 births
Living people
21st-century African-American women
21st-century African-American sportspeople
African-American basketball players
All-American college women's basketball players
American women's basketball players
Basketball players from California
Forwards (basketball)
Minnesota Lynx players
Oregon Ducks women's basketball players
People from Fontana, California
Phoenix Mercury draft picks
Sportspeople from San Bernardino County, California
Washington Mystics players